Tereza Mrdeža was the defending champion, but lost in the second round to Anna Bondár.

Maryna Chernyshova won the title, defeating Réka Luca Jani in the final, 6–1, 6–4.

Seeds

Draw

Finals

Top half

Bottom half

References

Main Draw

Zagreb Ladies Open - Singles
Zagreb Ladies Open